The Sardinian regional election of 1999 took place on 13  and 27 June 1999.

The centre-right coalition led by Mauro Pili won the election but was short of a clear majority; Pili, who was appointed President of the Region was not able to form a majority and was soon replaced by the defeated candidate, Gian Mario Selis, who was not able to win the confidence vote of the Regional Council himself. The former President Mario Floris was asked to form a government avoiding a new regional election.

Results
Regional council election

|- style="background-color:#E9E9E9;text-align:center;"
! colspan="4" rowspan="1" style="text-align:left;" | Parties and coalitions
! colspan="1" | Votes
! colspan="1" | %
! colspan="1" | Seats
|-
| style="background-color:pink" rowspan="8" |
| style="background-color:" |
| style="text-align:left;" | Democrats of the Left (Democratici di Sinistra)
| DS
| 122,675 || 14.2 || 10
|-
| style="background-color:" |
| style="text-align:left;" | Italian People's Party (Partito Popolare Italiano)
| PPI
| 87,566 || 10.2 || 7
|-
| style="background-color:pink" |
| style="text-align:left;" | Democratic Federation (Federazione Democratica)
| FD
| 49,584 || 5.8 || 4
|-
| style="background-color:orange" |
| style="text-align:left;" | The Democrats (I Democratici)
| Dem
| 46,857 || 5.8 || 4
|-
| style="background-color:purple" |
| style="text-align:left;" | Italian Democratic Socialists (Socialisti Democratici Italiani)
| SDI
| 43,250 || 5.0 || 3
|-
| style="background-color:" |
| style="text-align:left;" | Communist Refoundation Party (Rifondazione Comunista)
| PRC
| 31,713 || 3.7 || 2
|-
| style="background-color:" |
| style="text-align:left;" | Party of Italian Communists (Comunisti Italiani)
| PdCI
| 18,257 || 2.1 || 0
|-
| style="background-color:" |
| style="text-align:left;" | The Greens (I Verdi)
| FdV
| 15,833 || 1.8 || 0
|- style="background-color:pink"
| style="text-align:left;" colspan="4" | The Olive Tree (Selis)
| 415,735 || 48.6 || 30
|-
| style="background-color:lightblue" rowspan="5" |
| style="background-color:" |
| style="text-align:left;" | Forza Italia 
| FI
| 169,470 || 19.7 || 13
|-
| style="background-color:" |
| style="text-align:left;" | National Alliance (Alleanza Nazionale)
| AN
| 85,201 || 9.9 || 7
|-
| style="background-color:blue" |
| style="text-align:left;" | Sardinian Reformers (Riformisti Sardi) 
| RS
| 38,259 || 4.4 || 3
|-
| style="background-color:" |
| style="text-align:left;" | Christian Democratic Centre (Centro Cristiano Democratico)
| CCD
| 34,866 || 4.0 || 3
|-
| style="background-color:grey" |
| style="text-align:left;" | New Movement (Nuovo Movimento)
| NM
| 28,771 || 3.3 || 2
|- style="background-color:lightblue"
| colspan="4" style="text-align:left;" | Pole for Freedoms (Pili)
| 356,567 || 41.3 || 28
|-
| style="background-color:" |
| style="text-align:left;" colspan="2" | Sardinian Action Party (Partito Sardo d'Azione) 
| PSdAz
| 38,422 || 4.5 || 3
|-
| style="background-color:orange" |
| style="text-align:left;" colspan="2" | Democratic Union for the Republic (Unione Democratica per la Repubblica) 
| UDR
| 35,177 || 4.1 || 3
|- for the
| style="background-color:red" |
| style="text-align:left;" colspan="2" | Sardinia Nation (Sardigna Natzione) 
| SN
| 15,283 || 1.8 || 0
|-
| colspan="7" style="background-color:#E9E9E9" | 
|- style="font-weight:bold;"
| style="text-align:left;" colspan="4" | Total
| 861,184 || 100.00 || 64
|-
| colspan="7" style="background-color:#E9E9E9" | 
|-
| style="text-align:left;" colspan="4" | Turnout 
|  || 66.3 || style="background-color:#E9E9E9;" |
|-
| colspan="7" style="background-color:#E9E9E9" | 
|-
| style="text-align:left;" colspan="7" | Source: Regional Council of Sardinia
|}

President election

References

Elections in Sardinia
1999 elections in Italy
June 1999 events in Europe